This is page shows results of Canadian federal elections in the city of Calgary, Alberta.

Regional profile
Calgary is by far the most conservative major city in Canada. This political leaning goes back to the days prior to Alberta's creation as a province, when what was to become Southern Alberta (the Kickinghorse Pass) was selected over Central Alberta (Yellowhead Pass) for the route of the new Canadian Pacific Railway under the auspices of Prime Minister John A. Macdonald.

Prior to Alberta joining confederation in 1905, Calgary (and most of what is now Alberta) was represented by the riding of Alberta (Provisional District). From 1904 to 1917, the riding of Calgary represented Calgary. It was then split into two ridings (Calgary East and Calgary West).

Like rural Alberta, Calgary was a clean sweep for the main right-wing party of the day in all but one election from 1972 to 2011: Progressive Conservatives through 1988, Reform in 1993 and 1997, the Canadian Alliance in 2000 and Conservative since 2004. The one break with this tradition came in 2000, when PC leader Joe Clark took Calgary Centre. Clark's notability of being a former prime minister and the controversy of Stockwell Day's stances on same-sex marriage being an issue that caused many voters in that riding to turn away from Canadian Alliance candidate Eric Lowther and support Clark instead. With Clark having retired by the next election, Calgary returned to a Conservative sweep from 2004 to 2011. The Conservatives won an outright majority of the votes cast in each Calgary riding during this time, with vote-splitting of the residual minority of the vote among the Liberals, New Democratic Party (NDP) and Greens causing none of the races to be even close.

This trend was broken in the November 26, 2012 Calgary Centre by-election, where Liberal Harvey Locke made a formidable showing, capturing nearly 33% of the vote, leaving Conservative Joan Crockatt to capture the riding with just under 37% of the vote. Not only was this well short of a majority, but it was the closest that a centre-left party had come to taking a Calgary riding in memory. The Liberals have increasing support, especially in the centre, and the recent seat re-distributions made Calgary Centre and several other ridings somewhat less safe for the Conservatives. Meanwhile, the NDP has similar overall levels of support as the Liberals, while the Greens are stronger in Calgary than most other areas, with the potential to finish ahead of the Liberals or NDP in some ridings (as is sometimes the case in rural Alberta).

Conservative support is strongest in Calgary Heritage (formerly Calgary Southwest, the riding of Stephen Harper) and Calgary Midnapore (formerly Calgary Southeast, the riding of Jason Kenney), two of the most affluent and ethnically homogeneous Calgary ridings where Conservative support routinely tops 70%. The visible minority communities in Calgary are clustered in the ridings of Calgary Skyview (formerly Calgary Northeast) and Calgary Forest Lawn (formerly Calgary East); however, these two ridings routinely have among the lowest voter turnout levels in urban Canada.

In 2015, Calgary Centre fell to Kent Hehr, the longtime Liberal MLA for Calgary-Buffalo. Calgary Skyview voted for Liberal Darshan Kang. They were the first Liberal MPs elected from Calgary since Pat Mahoney served a single term for Calgary South from 1968 to 1972. As a measure of how deeply conservative Calgary has historically been, the Liberals had only elected three MPs from Calgary-based ridings in their entire history prior to 2015, each for only one term. The city reverted to form in 2019, with the Conservatives again taking all of Calgary amid the massive "blue wave" that swept through Alberta, winning all ten of the city's seats by 10,000 votes or more.

2015 - 42nd General Election

2011 - 41st General Election

2008 - 40th General Election

2006 - 39th General Election

2004 - 38th General Election

Calgary East
Calgary Centre-North
Calgary North
Calgary-Nose Hill
Calgary Centre
Calgary Southeast
Calgary Southwest
Calgary West

2000 - 37th General Election

References

Calgary
Alberta federal electoral districts
History of Calgary
Politics of Calgary